Kolej Tunku Kurshiah (abbreviated TKC; formerly known as Malay Girls College; abbreviated MGC), is a premier boarding school located in Seremban, Negeri Sembilan. TKC is one of the best all-girls residential school (Sekolah Berasrama Penuh) and the first fully residential girls' school in Malaysia. In 2010, the school was awarded with the Sekolah Berprestasi Tinggi or High Performance School title, a title awarded to the 20 schools in Malaysia that have met stringent criteria including academic achievement, strength of alumni, international recognition, network and linkages. The school is specialised in leadership, innovation and invention.

In the 2013 PMR examination, the school managed to produce 96 out of 112 (85.7%) of straight A students with GPS 1.03 to the best school in Negeri Sembilan while for Sijil Pelajaran Malaysia (SPM), the school GPS is 1.5.

History
Tunku Kurshiah College was established as Malay Girls College in 1947. It was initially located at a piece of land located at the 2 1/2 Mile of Jalan Damansara, Kuala Lumpur. It was officially opened by Lady Gent, the wife of Sir Edward Gent, the Governor of Malayan Union. The place is now known as Bukit Damansara.

In April 1962, the college moved to a  site at Bukit Merbah, Jalan Tunku Kurshiah, Seremban. The college changed its name to Tunku Kurshiah College, in honour of the first Raja Permaisuri Agong. It was formalised when the college was declared open by Almarhum Tuanku Munawir ibni Almarhum Tuanku Abdul Rahman, the then Yang Di Pertuan Besar of Negeri Sembilan on 24 May 1963.

In 2000, TKC was chosen as one of the schools to participate in the Malaysia Smart Schools flagship application of the Multimedia Super Corridor (MSC). The school is the first batch of Cluster Schools which granted itself autonomy to select its own students in 2007. The school niche area is student leadership, English proficiency, and research and development (R & D). Three years later, in 2010, the school again was selected to be among the first High Performing Schools (Sekolah Berprestasi Tinggi).

In 2011, the school band was featured in a flashmob style, reality programme, Refleksi Orkestra in conjunction with Orkestra RTM 50 Golden Jubilee.

The school moved to its new premise in Bandar Enstek, Nilai in January 2013. TKC new campus has two main blocks, namely academic lower secondary and upper secondary, an administrator block which consists of an office, teachers' chambers, libraries, laboratories, and a main hall which can accommodate 1,000 people. The main academic block can accommodate as many as 650 Ministry's stream students and 100 International Baccalaureate students. The university-style campus also has dormitory blocks, a surau, warden's residence, cafeteria, convenient sports fields and arenas, as well as WiFi. The campus has an area as large as 17.4 hectares, built with cost approximately RM 75 million. The process of moving to new premises was documented by TV3 (Malaysia) documentary programme Majalah Tiga.

TKC basketball team is known as TKC KUDOS and TKC hockey team is known as TKC Vitesse. In addition, TKC touch rugby team is known TKC La Reine while TKC Wind Orchestra is popularly known as TKWO.

Rivalry
TKC has a long-held rivalry with other all-girls premier boarding schools, notably being Sekolah Tun Fatimah and Sekolah Seri Puteri.

Notable alumni

The alumni association of TKC is known as TKC Old Girls Association (TKC OGA). The association was set up in 1961, before the college was moved from Damansara to Seremban, and was officially registered on 18 January 1962. The setting up of the association came from the initiative of E. M. Pereira, the college principal then, and Puan Abbasiah Amirin Wiloughby, the first head girl of the college.

 Tengku Ampuan Bariah - Tengku Ampuan Besar (Queen) of Terengganu, wife for the sixteenth Sultan of Terengganu.
 Tunku Intan Safinaz - Tunku Temenggong Kedah
 Tunku Dara Naquiah - Negeri Sembilan royalty
 Mazlan Othman - Director of the United Nations Office for Outer Space Affairs, founding Director General of the Malaysian National Space Agency.
 Rosmah Mansor - wife of the sixth Prime Minister of Malaysia, Dato Sri Haji Mohammad Najib Razak
 Wan Azizah Wan Ismail - President of the People's Justice Party (Malaysia), Minister of Women and Family Development, Member of the Parliament of Malaysia for the Pandan, first female Deputy Prime Minister of Malaysia
 Robiah Ibrahim - the first woman to develop the latest method of lightning protection
 Nik Safiah Karim - Educationist and champions for women development and rights
 Zuraidah Atan - lawyer, Chairman of Yayasan Sukarelawan Siswa (YSS) Malaysia, honorary adviser of the National Cancer Society Malaysia (NCSM), member of the governing board of Universiti Sains Malaysia
 Rafiah Salim - Lawyer, first female Vice-Chancellor in Malaysia, Universiti Malaya
 Noriah Kasnon - Deputy Minister of Women, Family and Community,  Member of the Parliament of Malaysia for the Sungai Besar constituency
 Marina Mahathir - newspaper columnist and social activist,
 Shahrizat Abdul Jalil - Senator, former Minister of Women, Family and Community Development, Chairlady of the Women's wing of the United Malays National Organisation(UMNO)
 Alizatul Khair Osman Khairudin - Judge at Court of Appeal of Malaysia
 Ilani Ishak - former Member of the Parliament of Malaysia for the Kota Bharu constituency, Chairman of the Cabinet Committee Promote Understanding and Harmony Among Religious Adherents
 Putri Saniah Megat Abd Rahman - President of Librarians Association of Malaysia
 Kamilia Ibrahim - Kamilia Ibrahim & Co (KICO) law firm principal partner, former Vice Chairlady of the Women's wing of UMNO.
 Muzlifah Aisha Haniffa - dermatologist and immunologist, professor and Wellcome Trust Senior Research Fellow in the Faculty of Medical Sciences at Newcastle University

The new TKC OGA building is located in the Diplomatic Precinct Town Centre, which is sandwiched between Precinct 14 and 15 of the new administration centre of Putrajaya.  The particular site of the new MGC/TKC OGA building is under the first phase of the commercial centre of the project, comprising two-storey to four-storey properties.

References

External links
 

Colleges in Malaysia
Educational institutions established in 1947
Seremban District
1947 establishments in Malaya
Girls' schools in Malaysia
International Baccalaureate schools in Malaysia